Luis Alberto Orozco Peñuelas (born 1 March 1984 in Los Mochis, Sinaloa) is a former Mexican footballer.

External links
 

1984 births
Living people
Cruz Azul footballers
Atlético Morelia players
C.F. Mérida footballers
Club León footballers
Club Tijuana footballers
C.D. Veracruz footballers
Correcaminos UAT footballers
Dorados de Sinaloa footballers
Association football forwards
Mexican people of Basque descent
Footballers from Sinaloa
People from Los Mochis
Mexican footballers